Don Lathrop Love was mayor of Lincoln, Nebraska in two non-consecutive terms, 1909–11 and 1929-31.  He was born in Janesville, Wisconsin, on March 7, 1863, and died in Lincoln on September 12, 1940.

He married Julia Larrabee, daughter of Iowa governor William Larrabee on August 18, 1891.  Though childless, they adopted an orphan boy, Charles Burton Robbins whom they raised as their own son.  Charles Burton Robbins was buried in Arlington National Cemetery in 1943 with full military honors.

Love is now remembered in Lincoln for his gifts to higher education: 
In 1939, Love donated money to Union College to build an industrial building on campus and established a life annuity with the college a year later in 1940, two weeks before his death, that paid for the expansion of the Love Building to house a broom shop and a furniture factory. The Don Love Building at Union College has since been renovated and now houses the Ella Johnston Crandall Library, Campus Store, Career Center, Student Center, Teaching Leaning Center and the International Rescue and Relief (IRR) program.
A posthumous gift in 1941 built the original university library of the University of Nebraska-Lincoln, and the Love Library is named for him.

Notes

1863 births
1940 deaths
Politicians from Janesville, Wisconsin
Mayors of Lincoln, Nebraska
Nebraska Republicans